Stump Pond, also known as Reservoir MA94127, was a  reservoir in Pembroke, Massachusetts in the East Pembroke section of the town, east of the northern end of the Routes 14 and 53 concurrency, west of Keene Pond and southwest of Arnold School Pond. Stump Pond was drained in December 1992 due to the failure of an earthen dam on the north-west flank of the body of water adjacent to an inactive cranberry bog. The waterbody was originally created by flooding existing swampland sometime between the years 1920 and 1935  to support private cranberry bog operations. The waterbody was fed by Pudding Brook and McFarland Brook which are secondary and tertiary streams respectively to the North River. Stump Pond's legacy remains printed on paper and digital maps nearly 25 years after its draining. The land it once spanned has undergone significant successional change and is now home to a wide variety of swampland wildlife and vegetation which likely inhabited the area prior to its flooding. The shape of the water waterline is still clearly visible in satellite imagery of the area though it will likely become less visible over time as deciduous and coniferous trees encroach on the wetland.

Land Ownership 

The vast majority the land occupied by stump pond was owned privately by a single owner up until April 4, 2012, when the Town of Pembroke, MA purchased the 268.49 acre lot for $1.325 million. There remains private ownership of some of the land at the edge of the wetland from residences bordering the wetland on Edgewater Drive, Mera Mesa Drive, and Pleasant Street. The Town of Pembroke has expressed interest in using the land for well water to support business and residential growth in North Pembroke.

References

External links
Environment Protection Agency
South Shore Coastal Watersheds - Lake Assessments

Lakes of Plymouth County, Massachusetts
Pembroke, Massachusetts
Reservoirs in Massachusetts